Christmas in the City is the third studio album by American singer Lea Michele. It was released through Sony Music Entertainment on October 25, 2019. The album was produced by Peer Åström and Adam Anders, who produced the tracks featured on Glee. Christmas in the City features an original track, "Christmas in New York", and three duets—Michele sings with Jonathan Groff on "I'll Be Home for Christmas", with Darren Criss on "White Christmas" and with Cynthia Erivo on "Angels We Have Heard on High". "It's the Most Wonderful Time of the Year" was released ahead of the album on September 19, 2019 as the lead single.

Background
Michele titled the album Christmas in the City as she grew up in New York City, calling the season "such a beautiful time of year". She also said it was "always [her] dream to make a Christmas record [...] every single song that I picked [...] these are my most favorite Christmas songs." Michele called the original track, "Christmas in New York", "the real anthem of the album", elaborating that "it paints this beautiful picture of New York, but it also is really about what it means to be with your family and friends and engaged in that holiday spirit".

Singles
"It's the Most Wonderful Time of the Year" was released as the lead single along with the album pre-order on September 19, 2019. The song included in the soundtrack of Same Time, Next Christmas (2019), a television movie in which Michele is a co-star.

"Christmas in New York" was released as the second single from the album. Its music video was released on November 19, 2019.

Track listing

Charts

References

2019 Christmas albums
Christmas albums by American artists
Lea Michele albums
Pop Christmas albums
Sony Records albums